DYWT (105.9 FM), broadcasting as 105.9 Wild FM, is a radio station owned and operated by UM Broadcasting Network. The station's studio and transmitter are located at the 4th Floor, Perpetual Succor Bldg., Jalandoni St., Iloilo City.

History
The station was formerly located in Bacolod from its inception in 1997 to April 2011, when it relocated to Iloilo City. In September 2016, it moved its frequency from 92.7 FM to 105.9 FM for better signal reception.

On April 8, 2017, at 12:55 am, the station was damaged by fire started beside the station studio. The station's transmitter was believed to have been damaged by heat from the fire. It was declared fire out around an hour past 2am. A few days later after the fire incident, the station resumed its broadcast.

NOTE:
NTC is now currently trying to re-arrange the Iloilo Frequency to table 2 (105.9) from table 4 (92.7) which is being used by Bacolod Frequencies. Target accomplishment is the year 2030 or later date.

References

Radio stations in Iloilo City
Radio stations established in 1997